Darreh Mahalleh (also Romanized as Darreh Maḩalleh; also known as Dārā Maḩalleh) is a village in Rahmatabad Rural District, Rahmatabad and Blukat District, Rudbar County, Gilan Province, Iran. At the 2006 census, its population was 283, in 85 families.

References 

Populated places in Rudbar County